"Good Morrowe" is a poem written by George Gascoigne in 1557 and set to music by the English composer Sir Edward Elgar in 1929.  Elgar titled it in modern English "Good Morrow" with the subtitle "A simple Carol for His Majesty's happy recovery", and it is a setting for unaccompanied four-part choir (SATB), though a piano accompaniment is provided.

The work was written to celebrate the recovery of King George V from serious illness.  In October 1929, Elgar, as Master of the King's Musick, was invited by Walford Davies (organist at St. George's Chapel, Windsor and himself next holder of that post) to write an appropriate work to be performed by the choir of St. George's at their Annual Concert in Windsor Castle on 9 December 1929.  Elgar conducted the choir, and the performance was broadcast to the nation.

Elgar found the poem, called "You that have spent the silent night" in a volume of poems by George Gascoigne entitled "A hundreth Sundrie Floures bound up in one small Posie". from which he extracted five verses. He gave the poem a hymn-like setting, possibly from a tune to a hymn "Praise ye the Lord on every height" he had written in his youth, and he called it 'just a simple tune'.

Lyrics
Though Elgar changed Gascoigne's verse to modern English, he requested that the original sixteenth-century text be shown on the last page of the vocal score and be printed like that on programmes:

Recordings
 Choral Music of Edward Elgar  The Choir of Trinity College, Cambridge, director Richard Marlow

Notes

References

External links

Compositions by Edward Elgar
Choral compositions